John Arthur Watts (19 April 1947 – 8 September 2016) was a Conservative Party Member of Parliament in the United Kingdom House of Commons between 1983 and 1997.

After boundary changes in 1983, Watts defeated Joan Lestor, the former Labour MP for Eton and Slough, to win the new constituency of Slough. John Watts decided not to contest the Slough seat at 1997 General Election due to unfavourable boundary changes and contested Reading East where the sitting Conservative MP was retiring; however, he was defeated in Reading East by Jane Griffiths in 1997.

Watts died in September 2016 at the age of 69.

References

1947 births
2016 deaths
Conservative Party (UK) MPs for English constituencies
People from Slough
Government and politics of Slough
UK MPs 1983–1987
UK MPs 1987–1992
UK MPs 1992–1997